Edenfield is a surname. Notable people with the surname include:

Berry Avant Edenfield (1934–2015), American judge and politician
Ken Edenfield (born 1967), American baseball player
Kenny Edenfield (born 1965), American football coach
Newell Edenfield (1911–1981), American judge and United States Navy officer